Dennis Neal McKnight  (born September 12, 1959) is an American football coach and former guard who is currently the offensive line coach for the Seattle Sea Dragons He played in the National Football League for the San Diego Chargers, Detroit Lions, and the Philadelphia Eagles.  McKnight played college football at Drake University.

Coaching career
McKnight was the running back coach of the Edmonton Eskimos in 2011.  On February 1, 2012 Lamar University hired McKnight to take over as the offensive line and special teams coach.

McKnight was named offensive line coach for the Hamilton Tiger-Cats on March 1, 2018. He originally joined the organization as special teams coordinator on February 9, 2017.

On December 5, 2019 the  Houston Roughnecks hired McKnight to take over as the offensive assistant and special teams coach.

McKnight was officially hired by the Seattle Sea Dragons on September 13, 2022

References

External links
 Lamar profile

1959 births
Living people
American football offensive linemen
Detroit Lions players
Drake Bulldogs football players
Edmonton Elks coaches
Hamilton Tiger-Cats coaches
Hawaii Rainbow Warriors football coaches
Houston Roughnecks coaches
Lamar Cardinals football coaches
Philadelphia Eagles players
San Diego Chargers players
San Diego State Aztecs football coaches
SMU Mustangs football coaches
Southeast Missouri State Redhawks football coaches
Junior college football coaches in the United States
People from Dallas
Sportspeople from Staten Island
Players of American football from New York City
Washington State Cougars football coaches